This article lists the WTA Awards given by the Women's Tennis Association to players and coaches for achievements during a season or their careers.

Player of the Year

Doubles Team of the Year

Most Improved Player

Newcomer of the Year

Comeback Player of the Year

Diamond Aces 

This award is named for the late WTA trailblazer Jerry Diamond and is awarded to the player who gives endlessly to promote the game of tennis on and off the court.

Peachy Kellmeyer Player Service 

Award named for Peachy Kellmeyer, former player and the first tour director of the fledgling Virginia Slims circuit (precursor of WTA Tour). In 2020, the award was presented to all the members of the WTA Players' Council, as the group "worked diligently discussing proposals and obtaining feedback to help the Tour return safely and successfully, all with a dedicated commitment to their fellow players", following the suspension of the tour due to the COVID-19 pandemic.

Karen Krantzcke Sportsmanship Award 

Award named for Karen Krantzcke, an Australian player who died of a heart attack whilst jogging, aged 31, on 11 April 1977. Currently this award and only one other award, the Peachy Kellmeyer Player Service, are uniquely given after a vote by fellow players.

Georgina Clark Mother Award

WTA Coach of the Year Award

Fan Favorite Awards

Tournament Awards

Yearly awards 

 2013
 2014
 2015
 2016
 2017
 2018
 2019
 2020

See also 

 ATP Awards
 ITF World Champions
 World number 1 ranked female tennis players
 World number 1 ranked male tennis players
 Tennis statistics

Notes

References 

 
 
 

 
Tennis awards

Tennis records and statistics